Gary McLinton Downs, Jr. (born June 6, 1972 in New Bern, North Carolina) is currently the Recruiting Coordinator and running backs coach at East Tennessee State University. Gary is a former American football running back in the National Football League for the New York Giants, the Denver Broncos, and the Atlanta Falcons.  He was also an assistant coach for NFL Europa's Amsterdam Admirals.

Downs played college football at North Carolina State University and was selected in the third round of the 1994 NFL Draft by the Giants.  He played in 69 games over six NFL seasons from 1994 to 2000.  He rushed for 149 yards and caught nine passes for 66 yards.
Gary Downs’ spouse is Tanya Shorter Downs from Cary N.C. They have three children, Kameron, Josh, and Caleb Downs. Kameron played women's soccer for Kennesaw State University, Josh is currently a wide receiver for North Carolina, and Caleb is a highly sought-after football recruit in the class of 2023.

References

Sources
 NFL Europa profile
 Gary Downs stats at databasefootball.com

Living people
1972 births
Sportspeople from Columbus, Georgia
American football running backs
NC State Wolfpack football players
New York Giants players
Denver Broncos players
Atlanta Falcons players
Amsterdam Admirals coaches
Players of American football from Columbus, Georgia